List of hospitals and medical centers in Kano State, Nigeria.

References

Kano
Buildings and structures in Kano
Hospitals in Nigeria
Organizations based in Kano
Hospitals
Kano
Kano